The Penobscot River (Abenaki: Pαnawάhpskewtəkʷ) is a  river in the U.S. state of Maine. Its drainage basin contains .

It arises from four branches in several lakes in north-central Maine, which flow generally east. Also at Bangor is the tributary Kenduskeag Stream. It empties into the Atlantic Ocean in Penobscot Bay. It is home to the Penobscot people that live on Indian Island, and considered to be The People's lifeblood.

History

Norumbega
Most historians have accepted the Penobscot region as Jean Allefonsce's source for Norumbega, though the matter was hotly contested by some nineteenth century antiquarians, who argued that the name should be identified with their own river or region.

Navigation
The Penobscot River was an early trade corridor to interior Maine from the Atlantic coast.  Ocean ships could navigate upstream to Bangor.  The cities of Rockland, Belfast, Brewer and Bangor, and the towns of Rockport, Camden, Northport, Searsport, Stockton Springs, Castine, Bucksport, Frankfort, Winterport, Orrington, and Hampden developed adjacent to the Penobscot River estuary.  The river upstream of Bangor became an important transportation corridor for log driving to bring wooden logs and pulpwood from interior forests to sawmills and paper mills built to use water power where the city of Howland and the towns of Veazie, Orono, Old Town, Milford, Passadumkeag, West Enfield, Lincoln, Winn, Mattawamkeag, Medway, and Millinocket developed.

European colony
The first European known to have explored the river in 1524 was Estêvão Gomes, a Portuguese navigator who sailed in the service of Spain in the 1520s. The Spaniards, led by Gomez, were the first Europeans to make landfall in what is now Maine, followed by the Frenchman Samuel de Champlain in 1605. A few years later French Jesuit priests came among the Penobscot people as missionaries and converted them to Catholicism. The French settlement of Pentagouet, now Castine, was founded at the point where the river becomes Penobscot Bay, and the Penobscot people made a permanent settlement at Indian Old Town, Maine on an island above the head of navigation, around the Catholic mission. Throughout the first  half of the 17th centuries, these were likely the only permanent settlements on the river, although the Penobscots considered the entire river and bay their hunting ground and maintained other seasonal villages along its banks.

In 1669, the Mohawk made several raids from the west that were very destructive to the Penobscot people. During Father Rale's War, New England settlers from Massachusetts also sent periodic raiding parties to the Penobscot, destroying the primary native village in 1723. In a treaty of 1752, however, Massachusetts laid claim to the entire Penobscot watershed, and in 1759 the Pownall Expedition, led by Governor Thomas Pownall, established Fort Pownall on Cape Jellison in what is now Stockton Springs. This signaled the end of French influence over the Penobscot, and the incorporation of the Penobscot River valley into New England.

British colony
The first permanent settler from British North America on the river was Joshua Treat (1726–1802), who was initially the armorer and translator at Fort Pownall. His oldest son, Joshua Treat, Jr., built a log house and sawmill at Marsh Bay in what is now Frankfort, and other members of their extended family, joined by additional settlers from Massachusetts and New Hampshire, pushed ever further up-river, eventually restricting the Penobscot people to Indian Island (Old Town, Maine), the present Penobscot Indian Reservation.

American Revolution and modern history

During the American Revolutionary War, the river and bay were the site of the disastrous 1779 Penobscot Expedition, where an entire American fleet was destroyed in a botched attempt to retake Maine from the British. During the War of 1812, the British again invaded Maine and defeated an American force at the Battle of Hampden, sacking the town of Bangor in the process. To prevent this from happening a third time, and because the nearby boundary between the United States and British Canada was still contested into the 1840s, the Federal government in 1844 began constructing a huge granite fort, Fort Knox, opposite the town of Bucksport, near the mouth of the river. The fort never fired a shot in anger, but remains one of the Penobscot's major man-made landmarks.

In the 19th century the river was a conduit for the transport of logs from Maine's Great North Woods, to be sawed into lumber at mills around Old Town and Orono, and transported on ships from Bangor, at the head of tide. A secondary economic use made of the river late in the century was as a source of sawed ice for urban markets.

In 1931 the Waldo-Hancock Bridge was opened to carry US Route 1 across the river at the Penobscot Narrows between Prospect, in Waldo County, and Verona Island just below Bucksport.

During the 20th century, lumbering was largely supplanted by papermaking, in the form of large wood pulp and paper mills located all along the river from Millinocket and East Millinocket in the north, to South Brewer and Bucksport in the south. Wood pulp and paper mills create dioxins as a byproduct of the chlorine bleaching process in making paper. This substance was discharged from seven mills located close to the Tribal community of Penobscot people, along the Penobscot river. Dioxins, which are highly potent toxic chemicals that may cause cancer and other health problems, were being poured daily into this adjacent river, the Penobscot. Rebecca Sockbeson, a Penobscot, is quoted saying that her people have survived on fish from this river, but "now we are dying from it." She continued on to say that "neither dioxin nor cancer is indigenous to the Penobscot people, however they are both pervasive in my tribal community." As an Indigenous community trying to maintain traditional subsistence living and eating such as fishing or foraging, their way of life and their physical bodies are unequally burdened by issues of water quality and pollution. The health and survival of the Penobscot people is further threatened by the impact that persistent organic pollutants (POPs) have on reproduction and the health of their children. The 2015 collaborative report, The Penobscot River and Environmental Contaminants: Assessment of Tribal Exposure Through Sustenance Lifeways, confirms through a four-year quantitative study that these unequal burdens and harmful level of toxins are very real threats and realities faced by the community’s indigenous people. Sockbeson concludes that a treaty is required to ensure that "the breast and spoon we feed our babies with is not filled with cancer, diabetes, learning disabilities, and attention deficit [disorder]."

The development of cheap hydropower also attracted other types of light manufacturing, like textiles and shoes.

21st century
In the 21st century, with the continuing decline of the Maine paper industry, and the divestiture of its woodlands, the Penobscot watershed has become more and more associated with recreational use (fishing, hunting, boating, and tourism) and less with manufacturing. 

Only in 2022, after more than a half century of mercury contamination, Maine’s longest river is finally getting cleaned up.
As part of the Penobscot River Restoration Project, several dams were modified or removed to improve river conditions. Demolition began on the Great Works Dam in 2012, and the Veazie Dam in 2013. A fish ladder was installed at Milford Dam. A fish bypass was installed at Howland Dam. This led to an increase in the number of Atlantic Salmon, Shad, and other fish species in the river.

In 2006 the Waldo-Hancock Bridge was closed and replaced by the Penobscot Narrows Bridge, a 2,120 foot long, $85,000,000 structure with 135 feet between the water and the bridge’s deck, and the original bridge was subsequently demolished in 2013. A bridge observatory in the support tower on the Waldo County side 420 feet above the surface of the river is open to the public,  the only bridge observatory in the United States, and only one of four bridge observatories in the world. The two 447 foot tall granite towers of the bridge are patterned after the Washington Monument which had been largely built with granite quarried from nearby Mt. Waldo.

River flow and gauges 
The United States government maintains three river flow gages on the Penobscot river.

Angling
Angling, including fly fishing, is common on the river.  The West Branch is known as a world class landlocked salmon river, while the East Branch is known for its smallmouth bass fishery.  In 2008, the Atlantic Salmon Commission opened the main stem of the river to catch and release fly fishing for Atlantic salmon.

The West Branch is home to landlocked salmon and Brook Trout. There are many deep pools within the river, due to the many slate ledges, making the river ideal for fishing from shore, though there are still areas that are good for canoe fishing. With the Ripogenus Dam by Chesuncook Lake, the West Branch is able to sustain the large landlocked salmon found there, with twelve miles of heavy rapids, deep runs, large pools, and slower moving water in some sections. Baxter State Park is located to the north.

Some of the river's rapids are class IV or even V, making this one of the roughest rivers in the area, and attracting whitewater rafters. Until 1971 the West Branch was a main thoroughfare for the Great Northern Paper Company to sluice its logs to its mill in Millinocket, Maine.  In 1971 Great Northern opened the Golden Road (Maine) for transporting the logs.  The road parallels the river.  The paper industry has been greatly diminished and the Millinocket mill was torn down in 2013. The Golden Road, still a private road, continues to be used by logging trucks and also people using the Penobscot.

May to June are usually when mayflies begin their first hatch. Caddisflies also start their massive hatch around this time, but it can extend into the fall at times. Stoneflies tend to hatch throughout the season. In the West Branch, fishermen are often required to use a variety of different techniques.

Popular culture
 Henry David Thoreau published an account of travelling up the Penobscot from Bangor in 1846, to climb Mount Katahdin in his work, Ktaadn.
 Author Stephen King placed his fictional town of Derry, Maine on the Penobscot.
 The Penobscot is also featured in the film adaptation of the Tom Clancy novel The Hunt for Red October as the location chosen in which to hide the Soviet Typhoon class submarine from spy satellites.
Part of the Annie Proulx novel Barkskins takes place in Penobscot bay.
In Margaret Atwood's, The Testaments, Baby Nicole and Aunt Victoria escape Gilead to Canada on the Penobscot River.

See also
 List of rivers of Maine
 Waldo–Hancock Bridge
 Penobscot Narrows Bridge and Observatory
 Fort Knox (Maine)

References

External links

 Real-time river flow data at Eddington – height only.
 Godfrey, John E. *The Ancient Penobscot, or Panawanskek. as transcribed from The HISTORICAL MAGAZINE and Notes and Queries concerning The Antiquities, History, and Biography of America. (Third Series, Vol. I, No. II; Whole Number, Vol. XXI, No. II) February 1872. (Morrisania, N.Y., Henry B. Dawson) pp. 85–92 (illustrated & annotated)
 "Joshua Treat, The Pioneer Settler on Penobscot River." The Bangor Historical Magazine, Vol. IV, No. 9-10, pp. 169–176 April, 1889.
 USGS River Basin Info
 "The Penobscot River Restoration Project"
 National Weather Service forecast of river levels and flow.

 
 Rivers of Maine
 North Maine Woods
 Penobscot Bay
 Rivers of Hancock County, Maine
 Rivers of Penobscot County, Maine
Rivers of Piscataquis County, Maine
 Rivers of Somerset County, Maine
 Bangor, Maine